Eric Jager (born 27 April 1957) is an American literary critic and a specialist in medieval literature. He is a professor in the department of English at University of California, Los Angeles, received his B.A. from Calvin College in 1979, and his Ph.D. from the University of Michigan in 1987.  He has also taught at Columbia University as an associate professor.

Select bibliography
 Blood Royal: A True Tale of Crime and Detection in Medieval Paris, 2014, Little Brown and Company
The Last Duel: A True Story of Crime, Scandal, and Trial by Combat in Medieval France, 2004, London: Random House 
The Book of the Heart, 2000
The Tempter's Voice: Language and the Fall in Medieval Literature, 1993

References

External links
"The Book of the Heart in Late Medieval Piety", by Eric Jager, 1995.
"Lost in the Archives", by Eric Jager, in The Chronicle of Higher Education, March 6, 2009 - discusses the writing of The Last Duel
'The Last Duel' Between French Knights, by Sheilah Kast, NPR interview, December 26, 2004 (audio, 10-mins)

1957 births
Living people
American medievalists
American literary critics
University of California, Los Angeles faculty
Columbia University faculty
University of Michigan alumni
Calvin University alumni
21st-century American historians
21st-century American male writers
Historians from California
American male non-fiction writers